Jeff Foust is an aerospace analyst, journalist and publisher. A senior aerospace analyst with the Futron Corporation in Bethesda, Maryland, he is the editor and publisher of The Space Review and has written for Astronomy Now and The New Atlantis. He was the writer of the blog Space Politics, which went on indefinite hiatus in 2014 when he accepted a position at Space News.

He has a bachelor's degree in geophysics from the California Institute of Technology and a Ph.D in planetary sciences from the Massachusetts Institute of Technology.

Publications
 with Ron LaFon: Astronomer's Computer Companion (with CD-ROM), 1999, No Starch Press,

References

External links
 Jeff Foust's website
 The Space Review website

American science writers
American astronomers
Living people
Year of birth missing (living people)